Magnetic North is the sixth studio album by Aqualung. The album was released in the UK and US on the 20 April 2010 and was recorded in Los Angeles.

On 23 February 2010, Hales released information on his Facebook page that he had finished the album "My album is now actually finished. As I suspected, it is called Magnetic North. I am very pleased with it". He went on to say "It's hard to describe. It's like 12 kids who you would never guess were in the same family until you hear them speaking. See? I told you it's hard to describe."

He also stated that tracks from the record and further details would be available in "The coming weeks thus driving you wild with anticipation."

On 2 March 2010, the debut single "Fingertip" was released on iTunes and via Myspace.

Track listing
"New Friend" – 4:00
"Reel Me In" – 4:05
"Sundowning (with Kelly Sweet)" – 4:24
"36 Hours" – 3:28
"Fingertip" – 3:15
"Lost" – 4:36
"Time Moves Slow" (with Alison Sudol) – 4:16
"California" – 1:20
"Remember Us (with Sara Bareilles)" – 6:10
"Hummingbird" – 3:56
"Thin Air" – 4:22
"Magnetic North" – 4:34

References

Aqualung (musician) albums
2010 albums